Musictoday is an entertainment marketing company located in Crozet, Virginia, near Charlottesville. It was founded and run by Coran Capshaw, the manager of Dave Matthews Band. Musictoday is a pioneer in pre sales of concert tickets, by starting fan clubs for hundreds of artists.  Musictoday's first fan club was Dave Matthews Band's Warehouse Fan Association.

Business model

Capshaw's business model is that of bands like the Grateful Dead and Phish, who ran mail order presales of their concert tickets to their biggest fans. Most mail orders involved fans mailing in forms, money orders, and return postage in the event the order could not be filled.  In 2005, Musictoday became the official in-arena merchandise vendor for Madison Square Garden.  On August 1, 2006, it was announced that Musictoday was sold to major concert promoter Live Nation.  Musictoday became a division of Live Nation subsidiary Ticketmaster until 2014, when the merchandise e-commerce division was sold to Delivery Agent, a multi-channel e-commerce provider focused on television.  In 2017, founder Coran Capshaw re-acquired Musictoday following the bankruptcy of Delivery Agent.

Musictoday is the sole-source fulfillment contractor tasked with the distribution of products manufactured and marketed by Zappa.com. A company selling CDs, films, and various ephemera related to the late musician and composer Frank Zappa, Zappa.com is owned and operated by Zappa's son, Ahmet Zappa. Music Today is also responsible for producing apparel for the group known as Black Lives Matter.

References

External links
Musictoday official website
Way Behind The Music, fastcompany.com

Companies based in Virginia